Tyria is a genus of tiger moths in the family Erebidae erected by Jacob Hübner in 1820. It includes one species: Tyria jacobaeae.

References

Callimorphina
Moth genera